Meledella is a monotypic genus of gastropods belonging to the family Zonitidae. The only species is Meledella werneri.

The species inhabits terrestrial environments.

References

Zonitidae